Samding Monastery "The Temple of Soaring Meditation"  is a gompa built on a hill on a peninsula jutting into Yamdrok Lake about  east of Nangkatse. It is associated with the Bodong and Shangpa Kagyu schools of Tibetan Buddhism.

Samding is the seat of Dorje Pakmo, the consort of the wrathful deity Heruka, who was the highest female incarnation in Tibet, and the third highest-ranking person in the lamaist hierarchy after the Dalai Lama and the Panchen Lama.

Closer to Lhasa, there is another branch of Samding Monastery on the small island of Yambu in Rombuza Tso or "corpse-worm bottle lake" (which, apparently, received this unusual name because it was used as a burial place for monks).

The abbess became famous when she turned herself and her nuns into sows to prevent a Mongol raid on the nunnery in 1716 (McGovern gives 1717 for this event). It was destroyed after 1959 but is in the process of being restored.

Unusually, monks as well as nuns both lived in the monastery under the abbess, Dorje Pakmo, although she now lives in Lhasa. Samding gompa was destroyed after 1959 but is in the process of being restored.

Description of the monastery

Further reading

Notes

References

External links
TBRC yar 'brog bsam sdings, monastery
Samding Monastery - November 1920

Bodongpa
Buddhist monasteries in Tibet
Buddhist nunneries in Tibet
Buddhist temples in Tibet